Lemmings Paintball is an action video game from the Lemmings franchise made by Visual Science and published by Psygnosis in 1996.

Unlike most of the Lemmings games, it does not use a side-scrolling perspective but instead an isometric view of the levels. The gameplay is also very different from other Lemmings games, focusing on splattering enemies with paint from a gun. The levels contain various puzzles including moving platforms, lemming catapults, and trampolines.

Lemmings Paintball was known as Lemmings Play Paintball during development.

Reception

A Next Generation critic commented, "Like most Lemmings games, the sound and graphics are cute and simple, but not stunning, and gameplay is entertaining. The biggest problem is ... when dealing with squares on the other side of raised areas, there's no way to tell if it's dangerous or safe, except by sacrificing a lemming to find out." GameSpot reviewer Tim Soete praised the game's strategy, networked multiplayer, soundtrack, inclusion of two older Lemmings games as a bonus, graphics, and challenge, while criticizing the frustratingly difficult terrain. GameRanking's scores list it as 63%, based upon three reviews.

References

External links
 Web archive of Psygnosis's official Lemmings Paintball webpage
 Lemmings Paintball game review at GameSpot
 

1996 video games
Action video games
Lemmings games
Multiplayer and single-player video games
Paintball video games
Video game spin-offs
Video games developed in the United Kingdom
Video games with isometric graphics
Windows games
Windows-only games